Curtis Eugene Raymond Terry (born August 27, 1985) is an American former professional basketball player for the Akita Northern Happinets of the Japanese bj league. On November 1, 2010, he was selected by the Texas Legends in the seventh round of the 2010 NBA Development League Draft.

College statistics

|-
| style="text-align:left;"| 2004-05
| style="text-align:left;"| UNLV
| 31 ||0  ||12.2  || .357 || .328 || .806|| 1.71 ||0.71  || 0.16 || 0.00 || 3.71
|-
| style="text-align:left;"| 2005-06
| style="text-align:left;"| UNLV
| 30 ||25  ||28.2  || .397 || .342 || .800|| 3.00 ||2.30  || 0.73 || 0.07 || 7.40
|-
| style="text-align:left;"| 2006-07
| style="text-align:left;"| UNLV
| 37 ||1  ||19.1  || .357 || .333 || .684||1.89  ||1.65  || 0.86 || 0.03 || 4.54
|-
| style="text-align:left;"| 2007-08
| style="text-align:left;"| UNLV
| 35 ||32  ||32.4  || .415 || .372 || .737|| 3.26 ||4.83  || 1.09 || 0.20 || 11.09
|-
|- class="sortbottom"
! style="text-align:center;" colspan=2|  Career

!113 ||58 || 23.0 ||.391  || .350 ||.745  || 2.46 ||2.41  || 0.73 ||0.08  || 6.71
|-

NCAA Awards & Honors
Mountain West All-Conference Third Team (Coaches) - 2008
Mountain West All-Tournament Team - 2008

Career statistics

Regular season 

|-
| align="left" | 2008-09
| align="left" |SBL
|16 ||0 || 13.3 ||.322  || .267 ||.600  || 1.50 || 0.69 || 0.06 ||0.00  ||3.06
|-
| align="left" | 2010-11
| align="left" |TEX
|1 ||1 || 37.2 ||.300  || .286 ||.625  || 4.00 || 2.00 || 1.00 ||0.00  ||13.00
|-
| align="left" | 2010-11
| align="left" |ITU
|8 ||   || 36.1 ||.412  || .345 ||.628  || 5.5 || 1.8 || 1.0 ||0.1  ||19.3
|-
| align="left" | 2011-12
| align="left" | Akita
|14 ||9 || 24.0 ||.373  || .345 ||.800  || 3.5 || 2.4 || 0.9 ||0.2  ||11.3 
|-
| align="left" | 2011-12
| align="left" | Academica Coimbra
|4 ||3 || 24.1 ||.472  || .348 ||.714  || 2.00 || 2.25 || 0.75 ||0.00  ||11.75 
|-

References

External links
Akita vs Toyama
vs Toyama 2
UNLV vs Oregon #31

1985 births
Living people
Akita Northern Happinets players
American expatriate basketball people in Angola
American expatriate basketball people in Japan
American expatriate basketball people in Portugal
American expatriate basketball people in Turkey
American men's basketball players
Atlético Petróleos de Luanda basketball players
Basketball players from Tacoma, Washington
İstanbul Teknik Üniversitesi B.K. players
Los Angeles D-Fenders players
Texas Legends players
UNLV Runnin' Rebels basketball players
Small forwards
Shooting guards